Luis Reyes may refer to:

Businessmen
 Luis Reyes (businessman) (born 1977), Salvadoran businessman

Sportspeople
 Luis Reyes (Bolivian footballer) (1911-unknown), Bolivian football defender
 Luis Reyes (Colombian footballer) (born 1954), Colombian football centre-back
 Luis Reyes (Honduran footballer) (born 1958), Honduran football forward
 Luis Reyes (Mexican footballer) (born 1991), Mexican football left-back